Tyler Austin Miller (born March 12, 1993) is an American professional soccer player who plays as a goalkeeper for Major League Soccer club D.C. United.

Miller grew up in Woodbury, New Jersey and attended Bishop Eustace Preparatory School.

College career
Miller spent his entire college career at Northwestern University.  He made a total of 77 appearances for the Wildcats and finished with a school record 36 shutouts.

He also played in the Premier Development League for Ocean City Nor'easters and Chicago Fire U-23.

Club career
On January 15, 2015, Miller was drafted in the second round (33rd overall) of the 2015 MLS SuperDraft by Seattle Sounders FC.  Four days later however, Miller opted to sign with German Regionalliga side SVN Zweibrücken where he made 10 appearances.  On July 9, 2015, Miller signed with USL club Seattle Sounders FC 2.  He made his debut three days later in a 4–0 victory over Arizona United SC.

Los Angeles FC
On December 12, 2017, Miller was selected by Los Angeles FC with the first selection in the 2017 MLS Expansion Draft. On March 4, 2018, Miller debuted in a match against his former team, the Seattle Sounders. Going on to win 1–0, Miller made 4 saves to keep a clean sheet.

Minnesota United 
On January 16, 2020, Los Angeles FC traded Miller to Minnesota United FC in exchange for $150,000 GAM in 2020 and $50,000 TAM in 2021. The transaction included Minnesota signing Miller to a new contract through the 2022 season with a club option for an additional year. On August 19, 2020, it was announced that Miller had undergone hip surgery and will miss the remainder of the 2020 season.

D.C. United
On November 23, 2022, Miller signed with D.C. United as a free agent ahead of their 2023 season.

International career
Miller has represented the United States at the Under-23 level.

Career statistics

Club

Honors
Seattle Sounders FC
MLS Cup: 2016

Los Angeles FC
Supporters' Shield: 2019

References

External links
 
 Northwestern University bio
 U.S. Soccer bio

1993 births
Living people
American soccer players
American expatriate soccer players
Association football goalkeepers
Bishop Eustace Preparatory School alumni
Chicago Fire U-23 players
American expatriate soccer players in Germany
Major League Soccer players
Northwestern Wildcats men's soccer players
Ocean City Nor'easters players
Sportspeople from Woodbury, New Jersey
USL League Two players
Tacoma Defiance players
Seattle Sounders FC draft picks
Seattle Sounders FC players
Soccer players from New Jersey
SVN Zweibrücken players
USL Championship players
United States men's under-23 international soccer players
Los Angeles FC players
Minnesota United FC players
D.C. United players